Susan Blakely is an American actress and model. She is best known for her leading role in the 1976 ABC miniseries Rich Man, Poor Man, for which she received a Golden Globe Award for Best Actress – Television Series Drama and an Emmy nomination for Best Actress. Blakely also has appeared in films including The Towering Inferno (1974), Report to the Commissioner (1975), Capone (1975), The Concorde ... Airport '79 (1979) and Over the Top (1987).

Early life
Blakely was born in Frankfurt, Germany, the daughter of American parents, Mary Louise, a former art teacher, and Colonel Larry Blakely, a career Army officer. After she attended University of Texas at El Paso, she moved to New York and studied acting with Warren Robertson, Lee Strasberg, Sanford Meisner at the Neighborhood Playhouse and later studied with Charles Conrad and Warner Loughlin in Los Angeles. She began a professional modeling career in 1967 at Ford Modeling Agency and in 1970 appeared in a television commercial for Dippity-Do, a hair styling gel.

Career
Blakely arrived in Hollywood in the early 1970s, and began appearing in supporting roles in films including Savages, The Way We Were, and The Lords of Flatbush. Her first major role was as Patty Simmons in the 1974 disaster film The Towering Inferno. The following year, she played the female lead roles in films Report to the Commissioner alongside Michael Moriarty, and Capone opposite Ben Gazzara.

Blakely gained wide critical acclaim with her leading role in the 1976 ABC television miniseries Rich Man, Poor Man, based on the 1969 novel of the same name by Irwin Shaw. For her performance, Blakely won that year's Golden Globe Award for Best Actress – Television Series Drama and earned a nomination for the Primetime Emmy Award for Outstanding Lead Actress in a Miniseries or a Movie. She earned a second Emmy Award nomination the following year when she reprised her role in Rich Man, Poor Man Book II. After her television success, she played leading roles in two movies in 1979: the disaster film The Concorde ... Airport '79 opposite Alain Delon, and the sport drama Dreamer with Tim Matheson.

During 1980s and 1990s, Blakely played leading roles in many made-for-television movies. She portrayed Frances Farmer in the 1982 film based on Farmer's autobiography, Will There Really Be a Morning?, for which she was nominated for a Golden Globe Award for Best Actress – Miniseries or Television Film. She played Eva Braun opposite Anthony Hopkins in the Adolf Hitler biographical film The Bunker (1981), and Joan Kennedy in The Ted Kennedy Jr. Story (1986). She appeared in such feature films as Over the Top (1987), My Mom's a Werewolf (1989), and Hate Crime (2005). She recently guest-starred on This Is Us and NCIS and in past years on Hotel, The Twilight Zone, Stingray, Falcon Crest, Murder, She Wrote, Nip/Tuck, Brothers & Sisters, Southland, Two and a Half Men, In the Heat of the Night (1988 TV series), and Cougar Town.

Personal life
In 1969, Blakely married a lawyer, Todd Merer but divorced in 1981. In 1982, Blakely married media consultant, film and television producer Steve Jaffe. They reside in Beverly Hills.

Filmography

Film

Television

References

External links
 
 

American female models
American film actresses
American television actresses
Best Drama Actress Golden Globe (television) winners
Living people
20th-century American actresses
21st-century American actresses
Year of birth missing (living people)